{{DISPLAYTITLE:Mathieu group M22}}

In the area of modern algebra known as group theory, the Mathieu group M22 is a sporadic simple group of order
   27325711  = 443520
 ≈ 4.

History and properties
It is a 3-fold transitive permutation group on 22 objects. The Schur multiplier of M22 is cyclic of order 12, and the outer automorphism group has order 2.

There are several incorrect statements about the 2-part of the Schur multiplier in the mathematical literature. 
 incorrectly claimed that the Schur multiplier of M22 has order 3, and in a correction  incorrectly claimed that it has order 6. This caused an error in the title of the paper  announcing the discovery of the Janko group J4.  showed that the Schur multiplier is in fact cyclic of order 12.

 calculated the 2-part of all the cohomology of M22.

Representations

M22 has a 3-transitive permutation representation on 22 points, with point stabilizer the group PSL3(4), sometimes called M21. This action fixes a Steiner system S(3,6,22) with 77 hexads, whose full automorphism group is the automorphism group M22.2 of M22.

M22 has three rank 3 permutation representations: one on the 77 hexads with point stabilizer 24:A6, and two rank 3 actions on 176 heptads that are conjugate under an outer automorphism and have point stabilizer A7.

M22 is the point stabilizer of the action of M23 on 23 points, and also the point stabilizer of the rank 3 action of the Higman–Sims group on 100 = 1+22+77 points.

The triple cover 3.M22 has a 6-dimensional faithful representation over the field with 4 elements.

The 6-fold cover of M22 appears in the centralizer 21+12.3.(M22:2) of an involution of the Janko group J4.

Maximal subgroups
There are no proper subgroups transitive on all 22 points.  There are 8 conjugacy classes of maximal subgroups of M22 as follows:

 PSL(3,4) or M21, order 20160: one-point stabilizer
 24:A6, order 5760, orbits of 6 and 16
 Stabilizer of W22 block
 A7, order 2520, orbits of 7 and 15
 There are 2 sets, of 15 each, of simple subgroups of order 168. Those of one type have orbits of 1, 7 and 14; the others have orbits of 7, 8, and 7.
 A7, orbits of 7 and 15
 Conjugate to preceding type in M22:2.
 24:S5, order 1920, orbits of 2 and 20 (5 blocks of 4)
 A 2-point stabilizer in the sextet group
 23:PSL(3,2), order 1344, orbits of 8 and 14
 M10, order 720, orbits of 10 and 12 (2 blocks of 6)
 A one-point stabilizer of M11 (point in orbit of 11)
 A non-split group extension of form A6.2
 PSL(2,11), order 660, orbits of 11 and 11
 Another one-point stabilizer of M11 (point in orbit of 12)

Conjugacy classes
There are 12 conjugacy classes, though the two classes of elements of order 11 are fused under an outer automorphism.

See also
M22 graph

References

 Reprinted in 

 

 (The title of this paper is incorrect, as the full covering group of M22 was later discovered to be larger: center of order 12, not 6.)

External links
 MathWorld: Mathieu Groups
 Atlas of Finite Group Representations: M22

Sporadic groups